Caloptilia roscipennella is a moth of the family Gracillariidae. It is known from all of central and southern Europe.

Adults are on wing from August to May and hibernate.

The larvae feed on Juglans regia. They mine the leaves of their host plant. The mine consists of an epidermal corridor, which is either lower- or upper-surface. The corridor widens into a tentiform mine, usually close to the leaf margin. Older larvae leave the mine and live in a leaflet, rolled into a tube. Pupation under a silk membrane in a conical roll at the edge of a leaf.

References

roscipennella
Moths of Europe
Moths described in 1796